OpenSC is a joint venture by World Wildlife Fund (WWF) Australia and BCG Digital Ventures. It produces a digital platform that uses data to verify a product's sustainable production claims and tracks that product throughout its individual supply chain. Consumers can then view the product's history by scanning a QR code with their mobile device.

History 
 
In 2017, WWF Australia ran a small-scale pilot program tracing tuna from fisheries in the Pacific Ocean as part of the WWF's Panda Labs program. Using data and experience from that project, WWF Australia collaborated with BCG Digital Ventures on the blockchain tracking platform, OpenSC. That platform designed to verify sustainable production claims and track food through its supply chain was officially launched on 17 January 2019. OpenSC-tracked food was served at the company's launch event in Sydney and later at a meeting of the World Economic Forum in Switzerland. At its outset, the platform tracked items such as seafood products like fish, but the company planned to add other commodities to its platform in the future. Markus Mutz has been OpenSC's CEO since its outset.
 
Austral Fisheries, which is a part of the global Japanese seafood company Maruha Nichiro, was one of the initial companies to adopt the OpenSC platform to track their fish and prawns. In July 2019, it was announced that Nestlé would start a pilot program to track food using the OpenSC platform. As part of the program, Nestlé will trace its milk from producers in New Zealand to its own Middle East-based factories and warehouses. It also plans to use OpenSC to trace its palm oil supply chains in the Americas at a future date. In September 2019, it was announced that OpenSC had raised $4 million (USD) in funding to assist with the further development of its platform. Investors included Working Capital and Swiss angel investor, Christian Wenger.

Platform 
 
The OpenSC platform uses technology and real-time data to verify a product was produced in an ethically or sustainable way, and it then tracks the food and other products throughout their entire supply chain. Although the company started out tracking fish and beef, it has expanded traceability to items like palm oil and dairy. OpenSC typically focuses on improving transparency of commodities with known "environmental or human rights risks within their supply chains," and its tracking data is designed to help companies and consumers ensure that products are ethically and sustainably sourced. Consumers can scan a QR code (typically on restaurant menus or on the product itself) to get access to the data about the product's history, which is stored on an open blockchain.

References

External links 
Official website

Australian companies established in 2019
Companies based in Sydney